Oxford dictionary may refer to any dictionary published by Oxford University Press, particularly:

Historical dictionaries
 Oxford English Dictionary (OED)
 Shorter Oxford English Dictionary, an abridgement of the OED

Single-volume dictionaries
 Oxford Dictionary of English (ODE)
 New Oxford American Dictionary (NOAD)
 Concise Oxford English Dictionary (COD)
 Compact Oxford English Dictionary of Current English
 Oxford Advanced Learner's Dictionary (OALD)
 Oxford Russian Dictionary (ORD)

Other works
 Oxford Dictionaries (website)
 Oxford Dictionary of National Biography (DNB)

See also
 
 Dictionary
 :Category:Oxford dictionaries